Cook County Board of Commissioners 15th district is a electoral district for the Cook County Board of Commissioners.

The district was established in 1994, when the board transitioned from holding elections in individual districts, as opposed to the previous practice of holding a set of two at-large elections (one for ten seats from the city of Chicago and another for seven seats from suburban Cook County).

Geography

1994 boundaries
When the district was first established, it covered part of the western suburbs of Cook County.

2001 redistricting
New boundaries were adopted in August 2001, with redistricting taking place following the 2000 United States Census.

In regards to townships, the district's redistricted boundaries included portions of Elk Grove, Hanover, Schaumburg, and Wheeling townships. The district covered the entirety of Hanover and Schaumburg townships.

2012 redistricting
The district as redistricted in 2012 following the 2010 United States Census, included parts of Arlington Heights, Barrington, Barrington Hills, Bartlett, East Dundee, Elgin, Elk Grove Village, Hanover Park, Hoffman Estates, Inverness, Mount Prospect, Rolling Meadows, Roselle, Schaumburg, South Barrington, and Streamwood.

In regards to townships and equivalent jurisdictions, it included portions of the city of Chicago, as well as portions of Barrington, Elk Grove, Hanover, Palatine, Schaumburg, and Wheeling townships. The district covered the entirety of Barrington, Hanover and Schaumburg townships.

The district was 128.64 square miles (82,328.36 acres).

Politics
From 1994 until 2018, the district was represented by Republicans. The district was considered to be a Republican stronghold during this time. In the 2016 United States presidential election, the Democratic ticket of Hillary Clinton and Tim Kaine won a strong victory in the district over the Republican ticket of Donald Trump and Mike Pence. The commissioner of the district flipped to the Democratic Party in 2018, a year which saw an overall strong performance by the Democratic Party in that year's elections in Illinois and an unprecedentedly strong and well-funded effort by the Cook County Democratic Party to target the district.

List of commissioners representing the district

Election results

|-
| colspan=16 style="text-align:center;" |Cook County Board of Commissioners 15th district general elections
|-
!Year
!Winning candidate
!Party
!Vote (pct)
!Opponent
!Party
! Vote (pct)
!Opponent
!Party
! Vote (pct)
|-
|1994
| |Carl R. Hansen
| | Republican
| | 
|
|
|
|
|
|
|-
|1998
| |Carl R. Hansen
| | Republican
| | 35,681 (61.00%)
| | Bridget Mary White
| | Democratic
| | 22,810 (39.00%)
|
|
|
|-
|2002
| |Carl R. Hansen
| | Republican
| |38,530 (59.56%)
| | Brian J. McPartlin
| | Democratic
| | 26,165 (40.44%)
| 
| 
| 
|-
|2006
| |Timothy O. Schneider
| | Republican
| |35,696 (52.67%)
| | Jim Steven Dasakis
| | Democratic
| | 32,075 (47.33%)
| 
| 
| 
|-
|2010
| |Timothy O. Schneider
| | Republican
| |41,106 (57.55%)
| | Jim Steven Dasakis
| | Democratic
| | 25,976 (36.37%)
| | Lara Ehorn
| | Green
| | 4,342 (6.08%)
|-
|2014
| |Timothy O. Schneider
| | Republican
| |40,569 (58.83%)
| | Michael A Urban
| | Democratic
| | 28,392 (41.17%)
| 
| 
| 
|-
|2018
| |Kevin B. Morrison
| | Democratic
| |52,807 (54.93%)
| | Timothy O. Schneider
| | Republican
| | 43,331 (45.07%)  
| 
| 
| 
|-
|2022
| |Kevin B. Morrison
| | Democratic
| |43,858 (57.80%)
| | Chuck Cerniglia
| | Republican
| | 32,027 (42.20%)
|
|
|

References

Cook County Board of Commissioners districts
Constituencies established in 1994
1994 establishments in Illinois